Pathan Walla is a small village of Lodhran District in the Punjab province of Pakistan. It is located at 29°32'4"N 71°37'15"E.

External links 
  Geographical Location

Villages in Lodhran District